The men's 5000 meter at the 2018 KNSB Dutch Single Distance Championships took place in Heerenveen at the Thialf ice skating rink on Saturday 28 October 2017. There were 20 participants.

Statistics

Result

Source:

Referee: Berri de Jonge. Assistant: Ingrid Heijnsbroek Starter: Alfred van Zwam 
Start: 14:05 hr. Finish: 15:43 hr.

Draw

References

Single Distance Championships
2018 Single Distance